Cronhielmsparken is a park in Malmö, Sweden. The park was named in 1969, like the nearby Cronhielm Road, after Johan Cronhielm.

References

Parks in Malmö